Gaju Bhai is an Indian flash-animated television series produced by Toonz Animation- Trivandrum, which airs on Disney Channel India. The series premiered on 18 April 2016.

Gaju Bhai typically follows a format of two 11-minute-long independent "segments" per episode. The show showcases the story of a Jollywood superstar Gaju Bhai and his transformation from a reel life hero to a real-life hero.

Characters

Main
 Gaju Bhai: Gaju Bhai is the title character of the show. He's a Jollywood superstar. He shares a strong bond of friendship with Iravan. He's an elephant. He is voiced by Damandeep Singh Baggan
 Iravan: Iravan is a 10-year-old prince of Gajrajpuri. He's an elephant too.
Bhagat: Bhagat is the commander of Gajrajpuri's army. He's a strict disciplinarian and often comes off as heartless and insensitive. He is a tiger.
 Mahaguru: Mahaguru is always sitting in a cave and meditating. He existed since the beginning of time. He is a hawk.

Recurring
 Miss Zuzee: Miss Zuzee is a cat and a journalist who devoted her life to find out the mysteries of Gaju Bhai's life. She wanted to be an actress.
 Shantilal: Shantilal is a crow and Gaju Bhai's manager, butler, make-up man, and secretary. He is always busy with his multiple mobile phones. He thinks and tells others that he's the one who made Gaju Bhai the superstar he is today, but only when Gaju Bhai is not around.
 Director: Director is a stereotypical Bollywood director who thinks his superstar is perfect. He always sees faults in others but never in his superstar. He is a monkey.

Reception
It was featured in the 10th Krackjack Karnival.

Accolades
Gaju Bhai won FICCI's Best Animated Frames: Character of the Year and MAAC 24FPS awards in 2017.

Film
A television film Apna Bhai Gaju Bhai based on the series aired on 3 July 2016.

See also
List of Disney Channel (India) series
List of Indian animated television series

References

2016 Indian television series debuts
2016 animated television series debuts
Indian flash animated television series
Indian children's animated action television series
Indian children's animated adventure television series
Indian children's animated comedy television series
Indian children's animated fantasy television series
Anthropomorphic animal characters
Disney Channel (Indian TV channel) original programming
Animated television series about elephants
Bollywood in fiction